The Aberdeen Pheasants was the primary moniker minor league baseball teams located in Aberdeen, South Dakota between 1920 and 1997. The Pheasants played in the Northern League from 1946 until the league folded in 1971. Aberdeen was the Class C affiliate of the St. Louis Browns until 1953, continuing with the franchise when the Browns moved to Baltimore in 1954, with the Pheasants remaining in the Oriole farm system.  Aberdeen had a team in the Independent Prairie League from 1995 to 1997, also called the Pheasants.

Origins

Aberdeen has always been a baseball town with organized teams playing semi-professional ball as far back as the 1890s. The Dakota League was organized after World War I and offered Aberdeen fans their first taste of professional baseball, as Baseball Hall of Fame inductee Al Simmons played for Aberdeen in 1922. That league folded in 1922. After World War II another professional baseball team, the Aberdeen Pheasants, was organized in Aberdeen as part of the Northern League and had their inaugural season in 1947.

Ben Siebrecht, owner of Siebrecht Florist and Greenhouse, was the president of a five-member board charged with the duties of organizing and operating that early Pheasants team. The board raised $25,000 by selling stock to local investors and were able to establish a working agreement with the St. Louis Browns as a source for players. That agreement survived the Browns' move to Baltimore and became the longest working agreement between major and minor league teams in baseball history lasting 26 years.

Many big name players wore the Aberdeen Pheasants uniform at some time in their careers. Pitcher Don Larsen, famous for pitching a perfect game in the 1956 World Series as a New York Yankee, played for the Pheasants in 1947 and 1948. Bob Turley was a 1949 Pheasant prior to winning the Cy Young Award in 1958 as a New York Yankee. Tito Francona played on the 1953 Pheasants prior to playing on 8 different major league teams. He even married an Aberdeen girl, Roberta Jackson, at home plate prior to a home game. Earl Weaver managed the club for the 1959 season. Jim Palmer pitched for the Pheasants during the 1964 season. Earl Weaver and Jim Palmer are the only former Pheasants to be named to the baseball hall of fame. Dave Leonhard pitched for the 1963 and 1964 Pheasants and pitched for the Baltimore Orioles from 1967–1972. Mark Belanger was also on the 1964 Pheasants and was eventually named the American League all-star shortstop in 1976 as an Oriole. Lou Piniella played for the 1964 team prior to moving to the majors that same season. Cal Ripken, Sr. was a manager of the Pheasants for the 1963–1966 season.

The minor league Pheasants met their demise when the Northern League folded after the 1971 season. The remaining teams, who all folded, were the Aberdeen Pheasants, Sioux Falls Packers, St. Cloud Rox and Watertown Expos.

Ballparks

Games were played at the municipal ball field located on the campus of Northern State University. The original stadium burned down in 1952 and was quickly replaced. Eventually the replacement stadium was torn down to make room for the Barnett Center. Early games during the first season started at 5:30pm because the field wasn't lighted but later during that season, lights were added thanks to contributions from the enthusiastic fans. The Pheasants built a steady fan base drawing crowds of over 3000 by their second season.

Mascot

Not to be forgotten is "Philbert" the cartoon pheasant drawn by Gordon Haug, the advertising artist for Aberdeen's Olwin-Angell department store. Philbert appeared on the front page of the Aberdeen American News the morning after each game with an appropriate comment about the game's outcome.

Significant events

The biggest game in Pheasant history took place in 1964 when the parent team, the Baltimore Orioles, came to town to play their minor league cohorts. The Orioles posted a 6-3 win in front of a capacity crowd.

The Pheasants' final season was 1971.

In 1995, local baseball enthusiasts re-established the Aberdeen Pheasant team and gave Aberdeen fans three seasons of baseball excitement prior to disbanding the organization at the end of the 1997 season.  During the 1995 season, the Pheasants ran over their Prairie League competition, setting an all-time minor-league record for winning percentage by going 56-13 (.812) in the league's regular season.

Historic information and photos provided by the Dacotah Prairie Museum.

In 2010, the former Sioux Falls (South Dakota) Canaries team was renamed the Sioux Falls Fighting Pheasants, presumably to give new life to the Pheasants franchise.  The move was not without controversy, as discussed in this editorial from the Aberdeen American News.

Notable alumni

Baseball Hall of Fame Alumni

 Jim Palmer (1964) inducted, 1990
 Al Simmons (1922) inducted, 1953
 Norm Stewart (1957) National Collegiate Basketball Hall of Fame, inducted 2007
 Earl Weaver (1959) inducted, 1996

Notable alumni

 Bob Bailor (1971)
 Steve Barber (1958) 2x MLB All-Star
 Mark Belanger (1964) MLB All-Star; 8x Gold Glove shortstop
 Bo Belinsky (1958-1959)
 Al Bumbry (1971) MLB All-Star; 1973 AL Rookie of the Year
 Andy Etchebarren (1961, 1963) 2x MLB All-Star
 Tito Francona (1953) MLB All-Star
 Roger Freed (1967)
 Don Heffner (1947)
 Chuck Hinton (1959) MLB All-Star
 Darold Knowles (1963) MLB All-Star
 Don Larsen (1947-1948) 1956 World Series Most Valuable Player
 Lou Piniella (1964) MLB All-Star; 1969 AL Rookie of the Year; 3x MLB Manager of the Year
 Cal Ripken Sr. (1963-1964)
 Wes Stock (1956)
 Bob Turley (1949) 3x MLB All-Star; 1958 AL Cy Young Award; 1958 World Series Most Valuable Player
 Eddie Watt (1963-1964)

Year-by-year record

* Baukol Playoffs based on last 30 days of the season

References

External links
Baseball Reference

Aberdeen, South Dakota
Baltimore Orioles minor league affiliates
St. Louis Browns minor league affiliates
Defunct minor league baseball teams
Sports clubs disestablished in 1997
Northern League (1902-71) baseball teams
Defunct baseball teams in South Dakota
Baseball teams established in 1920
Sports teams in Aberdeen, South Dakota